This is a list of notable people who were either born in Christchurch, New Zealand, or who spent a significant part of their lives living in the region.

A
Hugh Acland (1874–1956), surgeon
Jim Anderton  (1938–2018), Labour politician and deputy prime minister (1999–2002)
Harry Ayres (1912–1987), mountaineer, guide, and gardener
Ernest Andrews (1873–1961), longstanding mayor of Christchurch
Marcus Armstrong (born 2000), motor racing driver
Vajin Armstrong (born 1980), ultra-distance runner

B
Petra Bagust, (born 1972), Television news presenter
Simon Barnett (born 1967), public figure and co-host of morning radio show
Blanche Baughan (1870–1958), poet, writer and penal reformer
Peter Beaven (1925–2012), architect and heritage lobbyist
Ursula Bethell (1874–1945), poet and social activist
John Blumsky (1928–2013), journalist and broadcaster
Shane Bond (born 1975), player and coach of the national cricket team
John Britten (1950–1995) New Zealand mechanical engineer who designed a world-record-setting motorcycle with innovative features and materials
Kathleen Browne (1905–2007), artist
Gerry Brownlee (born 1956), National Party MP for Ilam electorate
Vicki Buck (born 1955/56), first female mayor of Christchurch and activist

C

Dolce Ann Cabot (1862–1943), journalist, newspaper editor, feminist and teacher
Tonie Carroll (born 1976) rugby league player, played for both New Zealand and Australia
Dan Carter (born 1982), plays rugby for Canterbury Crusaders and the All Blacks, highest test-match point scorer
Nathan Cohen (born 1986), world and Olympic champion rower
Brendan Cole (born 1976), ballroom dancer and television personality
Ray Columbus (1942–2016), singer-songwriter of Ray Columbus & the Invaders
John Cracroft Wilson ("Nabob" Wilson, 1808–1881), farmer of Cashmere and independent parliamentarian

D
Lianne Dalziel (born 1960), mayor of Christchurch, former Labour Party MP for Christchurch Central and Christchurch East electorates
John Deans (1820–1854), pioneer farmer
Sharon Shobha Devi Lingham (1956–2010), broadcaster 
David de Lautour (born 1982), actor and musician
Christopher Doig (1948–2011), opera singer
Brooke Duff (born 1991), Christchurch-born singer/songwriter
Andrew Duncan (1834–1880), mayor of Christchurch and provincial councillor

E
Lincoln Arthur Winstone Efford (1907–1962), pacifist, social reformer and adult educationalist

F
Eileen Fairbairn (1893–1981), geographer, climber, teacher
Daniel Faitaua (born c.1976), Television news reporter, currently working for TVNZ

G
Jon Gadsby (1953–2015), actor and comedian
James Gapes (1822–1899), mayor of Christchurch and flautist
Jo Giles (1950–2011), former sports representative and television personality
A. K. Grant (1941–2000), writer, historian and humorist
Charles Gray (1853–1918), independent parliamentarian and mayor of Christchurch
Jeffrey Grice (born 1954), classical pianist
John Grimes (1842–1915), first Roman Catholic bishop of Christchurch

H
Sir Richard Hadlee (born 1951), international cricketer
John Hall (1824–1907), independent politician, 12th prime minister of New Zealand and mayor of Christchurch
Sir William Hamilton, (1899–1978) Fairlie-born inventor of the jetboat, whose company, Hamilton Jet, was based in Christchurch from 1948
Joel Hayward (born 1964), academic, writer and poet
Graham Henry (born 1946), rugby union coach, head coach of the All Blacks
Tom Hern (born 1984), actor
Hera Hjartardóttir (born 1983), Iceland-born singer/songwriter
Fred Hobbs (1841–1920), mayor of Christchurch and drainage activist
M. H. Holcroft (1902–1993), essayist and novelist

J
Barry Jones (1941–2016), ninth Roman Catholic bishop of Christchurch
Churchill Julius (1847–1938), second Anglican bishop of Christchurch and first archbishop of New Zealand

K
Phil Keoghan (born 1967), television host of The Amazing Race
John Key, (born 1961), former National Party MP and prime minister
Nathan King singer/songwriter with the rock band Zed

L
Ladi6 (born 1982) Christchurch-born singer/songwriter
Charles Luney (1905–2006), famous New Zealand builder and company director

M
Justice Peter Mahon QC, (1923–1986), the New Zealand High Court judge who led the Commission of Inquiry into the 1979 crash of Air New Zealand Flight 901 into Mount Erebus.
Margaret Mahy (1936–2012), writer for children and young adults
George Manning (1887–1976), politician and mayor of Christchurch
Ngaio Marsh (1895–1982), crime writer and theatre director
Richie McCaw (born 1980), captain of the New Zealand rugby team, the All Blacks
Gary McCormick (born 1951), poet, radio and television personality, and co-host of morning radio show
David McPhail, (1945–2021), actor and comedian
Bernice Mene (born 1975), former Silver Ferns netball captain
Max Merritt (born 1941), singer-songwriter and guitarist
Juliet Mitchell (born 1940), professor and psychoanalyst
Anika Moa (born 1980), singer-songwriter
Elizabeth Moody (1939–2010), actor and director
Garry Moore  (born 1951), 44th mayor of Christchurch
Stacey Morrison (born c.1974), television and radio host
Benjamin Mountfort (1825–1898), dominant local architect
Charles Mountfort (1854–1941), surveyor
Anjali Mulari (born 1993), Christchurch-born international ice and inline hockey player

O
John Ollivier (1812–1893), politician and auctioneer
Denis O'Rourke (born 1946) politician and former City councillor
Daisy Osborn (1888–1957), artist

P
Frederick Page (1905–1983), music professor, pianist and critic
Robert Page (1897–1957), pacifist and industrial chemist
Bob Parker (born 1953), mayor of Christchurch during the 2011 Christchurch earthquakes
Sophie Pascoe (born 1993), Paralympic champion awarded nine gold medals
Mike Pero (born 1960), businessman and entrepreneur

R
Bic Runga (born 1976), singer-songwriter
Boh Runga (born 1969/1970), lead singer and guitarist in New Zealand rock band Stellar
Ernest Rutherford (1871–1937), Nobel Prize winning physicist, completed a BA, BSc and MA at the then Canterbury College

S
Robertson Stewart (1913–2007), industrialist and exporter
Ben Stokes (born 1991), English cricketer

T
Lilia Tarawa, former member of Gloriavale Christian Community, author, speaker, entrepreneur
Pana Hema Taylor (born 1989), television actor 
Gary Thain (1948–1975), rock bassist (Keef Hartley Band, Uriah Heep)
Mildred Annie Trent (1883–1942), cook, tearooms manager and community worker

W
Miho Wada, jazz flautist and founder of Miho's Jazz Orchestra
Nicky Wagner (born 1953), National Party MP for Christchurch Central and educationist
Deane Waretini (born 1946), singer-songwriter
Hayley Westenra (born 1987), classical singer, songwriter and UNICEF ambassador
Brooke Williams (born 1984), television actress
Colin Wilson (born 31 October 1949) is a New Zealand comic book artist 
William Wilson ("Cabbage" Wilson, 1819–1897), first mayor of Christchurch
Wizard of New Zealand (born 1932), public speaker, comedian and local iconic figure
Megan Woods (born 1973), Labour Party MP for Wigram electorate

References

 
Christchurch